The Monument to the Fallen (Monumento ai Caduti) is a Fascist era monument, dedicated to the Italians who died during the First World War (1915-1918), and located in central Reggio Emilia, at the south border of the Parco del Populo (also called Giardino Publico), at the border with Piazza della Vittoria and just west of the town's Opera House.

Description 

The monument consists of a rectangular tower 15 meters high on a rectangular plinth 17 meters at the longest: the east and west sides have each two Doric columns, while the north and south sides have free-standing bronze statues. The top of the central rectangle has four bronze plaques. 

North bronze statue: Winged Victory with sword
North bronze plaque Two oxen and two men plow a field
South bronze statue: Soldier with rifle
South bronze plaque: Three Fates measuring a life
East bronze plaque: Archer and two helpers
West bronze plaque: Fallen soldier and three women mourning

The commission was initially awarded after a competition to the sculptor Alberto Bazzoni (1889-1973). By the time the monument was completed, the design had acquired the fascist overtones honoring patriotic militarism. The soldier also has a facial resemblance to Mussolini.

Notes 

Italian fascist architecture
Buildings and structures completed in 1927
Buildings and structures in Reggio Emilia